Michelle "Shelly" Christensen is an American politician and member of the Minnesota House of Representatives. A member of the Minnesota Democratic–Farmer–Labor Party (DFL), she represents District 39B in the eastern Twin Cities metropolitan area.

Early life and education
Christensen was raised in Marine on St. Croix, Minnesota and graduated from Stillwater Area High School in 1973. She attended the University of Wisconsin–River Falls, graduating with a Bachelor of Science in secondary English and later Aspen University, graduating with a Master of Arts in education.

Career 
Christensen taught English at Stillwater Area High School and Stillwater Area Junior High for 16 years.

Christensen was first elected to the Minnesota House of Representatives in 2018, defeating Republican incumbent Kathy Lohmer.

Personal life
Christensen and her husband, Scott, have one child. She resides in Stillwater, Minnesota.

References

External links

 Official House of Representatives website
 Official campaign website

Living people
Democratic Party members of the Minnesota House of Representatives
21st-century American politicians
21st-century American women politicians
Women state legislators in Minnesota
Year of birth missing (living people)
University of Wisconsin–River Falls alumni